Buderim is an urban centre in the central Sunshine Coast region of Queensland, Australia.

Buderim may also refer to:
 Buderim (suburb), its central business district
 Electoral district of Buderim, an electoral district of the Legislative Assembly of Queensland
 Buderim Ginger Factory
 Buderim Group Limited
 Buderim Tramway (1914–1935) heritage listed former 
 Buderim House heritage-listed homestead